The 2014 Holiday Bowl was an American college football bowl game that was played on December 27, 2014, at Qualcomm Stadium in San Diego, California.  The 37th edition of the Holiday Bowl, it featured Nebraska from the Big Ten Conference and USC from the Pac-12 Conference.  It was one of the 2014–15 bowl games that concluded the 2014 FBS football season. The game started at 5:00 p.m. PST and was telecast on ESPN (also on ESPN Radio). Sponsored by National University, it was officially known as the National University Holiday Bowl.

Teams
This was the fifth overall meeting between these two teams, with USC leading the series 3–0–1 before this game. The last time these two teams met was in 2007.

Nebraska

USC

Game summary

Scoring summary

Source:

Statistics

Depth chart

Depth chart

References

Holiday Bowl
Holiday Bowl
Nebraska Cornhuskers football bowl games
USC Trojans football bowl games
Holiday Bowl
Holiday Bowl